"Murder" is the eighth single by British band New Order.

Released on the Belgian Factory Benelux label in 1984, it is an instrumental piece that contains samples of dialogue from the films 2001: A Space Odyssey and Caligula. It was recorded in winter 1982 during the sessions for the band's second album Power, Corruption & Lies.

The B-side is an instrumental version of the previous single by the group, "Thieves Like Us".

"Murder" was only released in Belgium as a single, but was available in the UK on import and made number 92. As such, it is the band's only release to miss the UK Top 75.

Sleeve 
The single's cover design by Peter Saville was based on a 'metaphysical' painting by Giorgio de Chirico. It forms a set with "Thieves Like Us".

Covers 
The Charlatans covered the song as an exclusive download for their 2008 single "Oh! Vanity". The Charlatans' lead singer Tim Burgess is a notable fan of the band and has cited Power, Corruption & Lies as his favourite album.

It was also covered by K-X-P and the track included on the Power Corruption & Lies Covered CD (free with the February 2012 issue of Mojo magazine).

Releases
As well as the original single, both tracks are available on the CD version of 1987's compilation, Substance, although neither track appears on the LP issue. "Murder" does not appear on Disc 1 of Substance, which otherwise contains versions of every New Order single A-side up to 1987. It instead appears on disc 2, which otherwise contains versions of every New Order B-side through 1987 (including "Thieves Like Us (Instrumental)"). The double cassette version of "Substance" (FACT200c) has "Murder" correctly located between "Thieves Like Us" and "The Perfect Kiss" on the A-sides cassette, but omits it from the track listing, instead incorrectly listing it as being on the B-sides cassette.

Track listing

Chart positions

References

New Order (band) songs
1984 singles
Songs written by Bernard Sumner
Songs written by Peter Hook
Songs written by Stephen Morris (musician)
Songs written by Gillian Gilbert
Factory Records singles
1984 songs